Double Deuce is a 1992 novel by American writer Robert B. Parker, the 19th book featuring the private investigator Spenser. The story follows Boston-based Spenser as he and his friend Hawk butt heads against a street gang while attempting to unravel the murder of a teenage mother and her young daughter.

Recurring characters
Spenser
Hawk
Dr. Susan Silverman, Ph.D
Lt. Martin Quirk, Boston Police Department
Sgt. Frank Belson, Boston Police Department
Tony Marcus

1992 American novels
Spenser (novel series)